The Omburu Solar Power Station, is a 20 megawatts solar power station in Namibia. The power station, which was developed and is owned by Namibia Power Corporation (Proprietary) Limited (NamPower), was constructed between March 2021 and June 2022 and was commercially commissioned on 24 June 2022. NamPower integrates the energy generated here, calculated at 67.8 GWh annually, into the Namibian grid. This is the first grid-connected PV solar power station, fully owned and operated by NamPower.

Location
The geographical coordinates of this solar farm are:
21°29'12.0"S, 16°01'46.0"E (Latitude:-21.486667; Longitude:16.029444).

Ownership
The power station is 100 percent owned by NamPower, the Namibian electricity utility parastatal company.

Construction and cost
The construction cost is reported as NAD:317 million (approx. US$20 million). The engineering, procurement and construction (EPC) contract was awarded to a joint venture between Hopsol Africa and Tulive Private Equity, both Namibian companies based in Windhoek.

Timeline
The solar farm took 15 months to construct. Commercial commissioning was achieved on 24 June 2022.

Other considerations
At the time this power station was commissioned, it was the source of the cheapest electric energy in Namibia at that time. The solar farm is part of NamPower's target to increase national generation capacity from "624 MW to 879 MW by 2025".

See also
 Erongo Battery Energy Storage System

References

External links
 Official Webpage of NamPower

Solar power stations in Namibia
Buildings and structures in Erongo Region
Energy infrastructure completed in 2022
2022 establishments in Namibia